3-Aminobiphenyl is an organic compound with the formula C6H5C6H4NH2.  It is one of three monoamine derivatives of biphenyl.  It is a colorless solid, although aged samples can appear colored.  It is obtained from 3-bromoaniline and phenylboronic acid by Suzuki coupling.

See also
 2-Aminobiphenyl
 4-Aminobiphenyl

References

Anilines
Biphenyls